The WWA World Welterweight Championship (Campeonato Mundial de Peso Welter WWA in Spanish) is a Mexican professional wrestling championship promoted by the Mexican Lucha Libre wrestling based promotion World Wrestling Association (WWA) since 1987. Because Lucha Libre emphasizes the lower weight classes, this division is considered more important than the normally more prestigious heavyweight division of a promotion.

As it was a professional wrestling championship, the championship was not won not by actual competition, but by a scripted ending to a match determined by the bookers and match makers. On occasion the promotion declares a championship vacant, which means there is no champion at that point in time. This can either be due to a storyline, or real life issues such as a champion suffering an injury being unable to defend the championship, or leaving the company.

It was first won by Negro Casas in 1987 and had been defended not only in Mexico but Europe, Japan and the United States as well. The title was held by many of the top cruiserweight wrestlers of the 1990s including Heavy Metal, Psicosis, Juventud Guerrera, Rey Misterio, Jr. and Eddie Guerrero. El Hijo del Santo holds the record for most title reigns with ten reigns. The current champion is El Hijo de Rey Misterio II.

Title history

Footnotes

References

External links
W.W.A. World Welterweight Title (Mexico)
WWA World Welterweight Title

Welterweight wrestling championships
World Wrestling Association (Mexico) Championships
World professional wrestling championships